University Arena may refer to:
 University Arena (Western Michigan University), basketball and volleyball arena at Western Michigan University
 University Arena (Limerick), sports complex at the University of Limerick
 University Arena, former name of The Pit at the University of New Mexico